Ute Dam (National ID # NM00293) is a dam at Logan, New Mexico in Quay County, about  west of the Texas state line.

It impounds the Canadian River for municipal water use. The dam is owned and operated by the Commission, which is authorized under state law to implement projects and negotiate with neighboring states on water issues. Ute Reservoir is the only large state-owned and operated reservoir in New Mexico.

Structurally the Ute Dam has the largest labyrinth weir spillway in the United States.

Recreation includes fishing for largemouth bass, catfish, crappie and walleye, and the facilities at the adjacent Ute Lake State Park.

References 

Dams in New Mexico
Reservoirs in New Mexico
United States state-owned dams
Dams completed in 1963
Buildings and structures in Quay County, New Mexico
Bodies of water of Quay County, New Mexico
1963 establishments in New Mexico
Weirs